James Lawrence Marshall (born December 30, 1937) is an American former professional football player who played as a defensive end for the Cleveland Browns (1960) and the Minnesota Vikings (1961–1979) in the National Football League (NFL). At the time of his retirement, he owned the career records for most consecutive starts (270), most points scored for an opposing team by a defensive player (2), most negative rushing yards by a defensive player (66) and games played (282), all of which still stand as records for a defensive player in any position.

Marshall is infamous for his 1964 "wrong-way run", a play in which he recovered a fumble and returned it 66 yards in the wrong direction into his own end zone, where he threw the ball out of bounds, resulting in a safety for the San Francisco 49ers.

Early life
Marshall was born in Wilsonville, in Boyle County, Kentucky.

Football career
Marshall played college football at Ohio State University. He left school before his senior year, and played for the Saskatchewan Roughriders of the Canadian Football League. He was then traded to the Browns in an NFL-CFL transaction, being swapped for Bob Ptacek. Marshall played the 1960 season with the Browns before being traded along with five other players (including fellow defensive lineman Paul Dickson) to the Minnesota Vikings in exchange for two draft picks in the 1962 NFL Draft. He played from 1961 to 1979 with the Vikings and finished with a then-record 282 consecutive games played (since surpassed by punter Jeff Feagles). Marshall started 270 consecutive games while playing for the Vikings, an NFL record since surpassed by Brett Favre.

Marshall played in the Pro Bowl in 1968 and 1969. He recovered 30 fumbles during his career, an NFL record. He was a member of the Vikings' famous "Purple People Eaters" (which consisted of Marshall (DE), Alan Page (DT), Gary Larsen (DT), and Carl Eller (DE)), and was the final player from Minnesota's initial expansion team of 1961 to retire. Marshall had 127 career quarterback sacks as a Viking, second-most in team history behind Eller. At the time of his retirement in 1979, Marshall had played in every game in Vikings history.

Marshall is one of 11 players to have played in all four of the Vikings' Super Bowl appearances in the 1970s.

Legacy
Marshall's No. 70 has been retired by the Vikings and he is a member of the team's Ring of Honor. In 2004, Marshall was named to the Professional Football Researchers Association Hall of Very Good in the association's second HOVG class. Marshall was a finalist for the Pro Football Hall of Fame in 2004, but was not elected.

Marshall resides in St. Louis Park, Minnesota.

The Wrong Way Run
During his time with the Minnesota Vikings, Marshall’s most infamous moment took place. Marshall was playing in a game against the San Francisco 49ers on October 25, 1964.

After recovering an offensive fumble, Marshall ran 66 yards the wrong way into his team's own end zone. After completing the run, thinking that he had scored a touchdown for the Vikings, Marshall then pitched the ball in celebration, and the ball landed out of bounds, resulting in a safety for the 49ers. According to Marshall, when he approached Vikings head coach Norm Van Brocklin afterwards, Van Brocklin said, "Jim, you did the most interesting thing in this game today." Despite the gaffe, the Vikings won the game 27–22, thanks to a forced fumble by Marshall, which Eller returned for a touchdown. 

Marshall later received a letter from Roy Riegels, infamous for a wrong-way run in the 1929 Rose Bowl, stating, "Welcome to the club." In 2019, Marshall's miscue was ranked No. 54 among the NFL's 100 Greatest Plays.

NFL records
 Most seasons played by a defensive player: 20  (tied with Darrell Green and Junior Seau)
 Most complete seasons played by a defensive player: 20
 Most consecutive games played by a defensive player: 289
 Most consecutive regular-season games played by a defensive player: 282
 Most consecutive game starts by a defensive player: 277
 Most consecutive regular-season starts played by a defensive player: 270
 Most fumbles recovered: 30
 Most opponent's fumbles recovered: 29
 Most yardage lost on a fumble recovery: 66

See also
Iron man
Own goal

References

1937 births
Living people
African-American players of American football
African-American players of Canadian football
American football defensive ends
Cleveland Browns players
Minnesota Vikings players
Canadian football defensive linemen
Ohio State Buckeyes football players
People from Boyle County, Kentucky
Players of American football from Kentucky
Saskatchewan Roughriders players
Western Conference Pro Bowl players
21st-century African-American people
20th-century African-American sportspeople
National Football League players with retired numbers